Nana Mizuki Live Diamond x Fever is the 8th live DVD and 2nd Blu-ray Disc release from J-pop star and voice actress Nana Mizuki. It has 5 discs containing her two concerts Live Fever 2009 and Live Diamond 2009.

Live Diamond 2009

Live Diamond 2009 was held on 2009-07-05 in Seibu Dome.

Disc 1

OPENING

MC1
The Place of Happiness

Nostalgia
 (acoustic)

MC2
STAND

PERFECT SMILE
MC3
Innocent Starter (acoustic ver.)
NAKED FEELS (acoustic ver.)
MC4

TEAM YO-DA SHOWCASE
Gimmick Game
Still in the Groove
Take a Shot
MC5
BRAVE PHOENIX

Disc 2

MARIA&JOKER〜prologue〜(SHORT MOVIE)
MARIA&JOKER
Justice to Believe
MC6
ETERNAL BLAZE

Bring it on!
Trickster
MC7

Disc 3

POWER GATE
MC8
Brand New Tops
MC9
DISCOTHEQUE
EXTRA TIME
END ROLL

Live Fever 2009~

Live Fever 2009 was held on 2009-01-25 in Nippon Budokan.

Disc 4

OPENING
DISCOTHEQUE
chronicle of sky
PRIDE OF GLORY
MC1
JET PARK
POWER GATE
Take a Chance
CHERRYBOYS SHOWCASE
ETERNAL BLAZE
MC2
Trinity Cross
innocent Starter
MC3

TEAM YO-DA SHOWCASE
Trickster
SECRET AMBITION
MC4 It's in the bag

Love you forever (SHORT MOVIE)
Crystal Letter
Tears' Night
Orchestral Fantasia

MC5
Astrogation

Disc 5

MASSIVE WONDERS
BE READY!
MC6
WILD EYES
MC7
SUPER GENERATION
EXTRA TIME
END ROLL

Special features

Live Diamond Making Movie
Live Fever Making Movie

External links
 Information on official website

Nana Mizuki video albums
Live video albums
Albums recorded at the Nippon Budokan
2009 video albums